Duckworth is an unincorporated community in Doddridge County, West Virginia, United States.

References

Unincorporated communities in Doddridge County, West Virginia
Unincorporated communities in West Virginia